The women's 200 metres event at the 2005 European Athletics U23 Championships was held in Erfurt, Germany, at Steigerwaldstadion on 15 and 17 July 2005.

Medalists

Results

Final
17 July 2005
Wind: 0.7 m/s

Heats
15 July 2005
Qualified: first 3 in each heat and 2 best to the Final

Heat 1
Wind: -1.5 m/s

Heat 2
Wind: 1.4 m/s

Participation
According to an unofficial count, 12 athletes from 10 countries participated in the event.

 (1)
 (1)
 (3)
 (1)
 (1)
 (1)
 (1)
 (1)
 (1)
 (1)

References

200 metres
200 metres at the European Athletics U23 Championships